Fouilloy is a commune in the Oise department in northern France. Fouilloy station has rail connections to Amiens and Abancourt.

See also
 Communes of the Oise department

References

Communes of Oise